Addiel Aarón Reyes Córdova (born October 30, 1983, in Colima City, Colima) is a professional Mexican footballer who currently plays for Venados on loan from Atlante.

External links
http://www.ascensomx.net/cancha/jugador/26664/eyJpZENsdWIiOiAxMDczMn0=

Living people
1983 births
Mexican footballers
Liga MX players
Atlante F.C. footballers
People from Colima City
Association footballers not categorized by position
21st-century Mexican people